Brothylus conspersus is a species of beetle in the family Cerambycidae. It was described by John Lawrence LeConte in 1859.

References

Hesperophanini
Beetles described in 1859